Balázs Hidvéghi (born 28 November 1970) is a Hungarian politician. He is a Member of the European Parliament, former Director of Communications of Fidesz-Hungarian Civic Union, and former MP of the Hungarian Parliament.

In the European Parliament

He has been a Member of the European Parliament since 2019. He is working in the Committee on Civil Liberties, Justice and Home Affairs. He is also a member of the Committee on Foreign Affairs, the Special Committee on Foreign Interference in all Democratic Processes in the European Union, including Disinformation, and the Delegation to the EU-UK Parliamentary Partnership Assembly. Until March 2021, as a member of the Hungarian Fidesz delegation, he belonged in the European People's Party parliamentary group. In March 2021, he left the EPP Group together with the other Fidesz MEPs. Since then he has been carrying on his duties as an independent MEP.

In national politics

He has been a member of Fidesz since 1989. In the 1990s he was active in the party's foreign affairs group. In 2004 he became Secretary of the Hungarian People's Party Group in the European Parliament and Political Advisor to József Szájer. After the Fidesz victory in 2010, he was appointed Deputy State Secretary for International Affairs and External Economic Relations at the Ministry for National Economy by Prime Minister Viktor Orbán. In this position he has been in a close working relationship with Minister György Matolcsy. Between 2011-2012 he also chaired the Hungarian OECD National Council. In 2012 he became the party’s Deputy Director responsible for Hungarian communities in the Carpathian basin and the Hungarian diaspora. Between 2013-14 he was also Member of the Hungarian Parliament. During this period, he was Vice-Chairman of the Committee on National Cohesion and a member of the Committee on Foreign Affairs. Between 2014-2016 he was Advisor, then Spokesman to the President of the National Bank of Hungary. In 2016 he joined the campaign team of the governing Fidesz party, and until 2019 was also its Communications Director. In May 2019 he was elected to the European Parliament.

Other activities

Between 1994-1996, he was a teacher at the ELTE Radnóti Miklós High School. Between 1994-2004 he worked first for the Hungarian Civitas Association, then for Civitas International, and later for the Council of Europe.

Studies
He graduated from Petőfi Sándor High School in Budapest in 1989, and from the Eötvös Loránd University in Budapest in 1995, majoring in English and Hungarian at the School of English and American Studies of the Faculty of Humanities (Eötvös Loránd University). In 1991, he obtained a Certificate in Diplomacy at the Institute for International Studies at the University of Leeds, England. In 2005, he graduated from the Robert Schuman University of Strasbourg, France with a DEA master's degree at the Institute of European Studies.

Family 
His parents are both engineers. He is married to Brigitta Hidvéghiné Pulay, a lawyer and a specialist in environmental protection and sustainable development. They live in Budapest with their four children.

References

External links
 

1970 births
Fidesz politicians
Members of the National Assembly of Hungary (2010–2014)
Fidesz MEPs
MEPs for Hungary 2009–2014
MEPs for Hungary 2019–2024
Politicians from Budapest
Living people